The Hoodoo Ridge Lookout is a historic fire lookout in the Umatilla National Forest (Walla Walla Ranger District) near Troy, Oregon, in the United States. It was added to the National Register of Historic Places as a historic district on May 26, 2015.

Built starting in 1925 and operating until the 1970s, the site served as a United States Forest Service fire lookout.  The district includes three contributing buildings and two contributing structures. The site contains a 1925 crows nest, a 1933 lookout tower, a 1933 cabin and garage, and an outhouse that may have been contemporaneous.

See also
 National Register of Historic Places listings in Wallowa County, Oregon

References

1925 establishments in Oregon
Buildings and structures completed in 1925
Fire lookout towers in Oregon
Fire lookout towers on the National Register of Historic Places
National Register of Historic Places in Wallowa County, Oregon
Umatilla National Forest
Historic districts on the National Register of Historic Places in Oregon